Siti Nur Syatilla binti Amirol Melvin (born 8 February 1991)  is a Malaysian actress and a model who debuted in 2012 and since then has acted in a few dramas and TV series.

Early life
Syatilla or Tilla was born on 8 February 1991 and hails from Parit Buntar, Perak. She is the second child from five siblings. Her mother is Malay and her father is Japanese. Syatilla is sister to the winner of the second season Gadis Melayu namely Siti Nur Syafiqah Amirol Melvin. After she finished her Sijil Pelajaran Malaysia SPM, she came to Kuala Lumpur to find a job.

Career
Syatilla debuted in 2012 and has acted in a few television dramas. The first drama she acted in was BFF (Best Friend Forever)  which aired on TV3 in 2012. Her name become popular after only eight months being in the film industry. Her experiences as a model in many advertisements helped Syatilla develop her talent in acting. She is also a former finalist of Dewi Remaja in 2010.

In 2016, Syatilla will be starring in a drama Imam Mudaku Romantik as lead actress . The drama will broadcasting at Astro Oasis and Astro Maya HD and will start  airing on 6 June 2016. The drama is also an adaptation from a novel which is using the same title.

Syatilla also will acting in drama Gondola Cinta Di Venice as Zulaikha which is as supporting cast. The drama will start broadcasting at TV2 in Selekta Prima (RTM) and airing on 7 June 2016.

Personal life
Syatilla married Malaysian actor Shaheizy Sam on February 8, 2016. The couple have a son named Syeriv Samheizy Bin Shaheizy Sam born in 2017 and a daughter named Sarima Samheizy Binti Shaheizy Sam born in April 2019 .

Filmography

TV series

Telemovie

References

External links
 

1991 births
Living people
People from Perak
Malaysian people of Malay descent
Malaysian people of Japanese descent
Malaysian actresses
Malaysian television personalities
Malaysian female models